Marko Milovanović may refer to:
 Marko Milovanović (footballer, born 1982)
 Marko Milovanović (footballer, born 2003)